Nazar Karajayevich Bayramov or Nazar Karajaýewiç Baýramow (born 4 September 1982) is a former football player who last played as a midfielder for Turkmenistan. 
Bayramow is the younger brother of Wladimir Baýramow.

Career

Club
Bayramov joined Access-Golden Grain in 2000, but failed to make an appearance for them before returning to Köpetdag Aşgabat.

Whilst playing for Zhenis Astana, Bayramov was banned for three-months after being registered as a Kazakhstani whilst playing for Turkmenistan.

During the 2002–03 winter break, Bayramov signed for Vorskla Poltava.

Baýramow left Aşgabat prior to the start of the 2020 season.

International
Baýramow retired from International football with Turkmenistan on 8 August 2016, following Turkmenistan's 1–0 defeat to Oman at the Sultan Qaboos Sports Complex in Muscat, Oman.

Personal life
Baýramow married in January 2005, and has three daughters with his wife Milana.

Career statistics

Club

International 

Scores and results list Turkmenistan's goal tally first, score column indicates score after each Turkmenistan goal.

References

External links

1982 births
Living people
Turkmenistan footballers
Turkmenistan expatriate footballers
Expatriate footballers in Kazakhstan
Ukrainian Premier League players
FC Rubin Kazan players
FK Köpetdag Aşgabat players
FC Vorskla Poltava players
FC Kyzylzhar players
FC Zhenis Astana players
Turkmenistan expatriate sportspeople in Kazakhstan
Sportspeople from Ashgabat
Turkmenistan expatriate sportspeople in Russia
Expatriate footballers in Russia
Expatriate footballers in Ukraine
Turkmenistan expatriate sportspeople in Ukraine
2004 AFC Asian Cup players
Turkmenistan international footballers
Association football midfielders
FC Aşgabat players
Footballers at the 2002 Asian Games
Turkmenistan people of Russian descent
Neftçi PFK players
Asian Games competitors for Turkmenistan